Abdullah bin Khalaf Al Dossari is a Bahraini journalist, poet, and politician.

Biography
Al Dossari was born in the village of Zallaq on February 26, 1961. He obtained his high school diploma in 1976.

He worked as a financial affairs officer at the Historical Documents Centre of the Royal Court from 1982 to 2002. He heads the Folk Poetry Society. He was chosen as a member of the jury of the puzzle competition held annually by Mohammed bin Rashid Al Maktoum, the ruler of the Emirate of Dubai.

In the 2002 Bahraini general election for the Council of Representatives, he won the fourth district seat in the Southern Governorate with 699 votes, or 67.54% in the runoff. In the 2006 Bahraini general election, he won with 656 votes or 62.90%. Finally, in the 2010 Bahraini general election, he won by acclamation after all rivals withdrew.

In October 2014, he was appointed Secretary-General of Parliament, an Undersecretary-level federal government position.

References	

1961 births
Bahraini journalists
Members of the Council of Representatives (Bahrain)
20th-century Bahraini poets
21st-century Bahraini poets
Living people